Philemon Hawkins II (September 28, 1717  September 10, 1801) was an American planter, military officer and politician who served in the North Carolina militia during the Revolutionary War.

Early life and political career
Philemon Hawkins II was born on September 28, 1717 in Charles City County, Colony of Virginia.  His parents were Philemon Hawkins I and Anne Eleanor Howard.   He was initially known as Philemon Hawkins, Jr.  His parents were from Devonshire in England, and settled in the Colony of Virginia in 1717.  His father reportedly descended from Sir John Hawkins, the English naval commander, and died in Gloucester County, Virginia in 1725.

After his father's death, Philemon Hawkins II moved to Bute County Province of North Carolina in 1735, along with his mother and two siblings, John and Ann.  In 1743 he married Delia Martin, daughter of Colonel Zachariah Martin of Mecklenburg County, Virginia.  He filled many public positions in Bute County and became the wealthiest man in the county.  In 1771 he served as an aide-de-camp to Governor William Tryon during the expedition against the Regulators.  He served as a delegate to both North Carolina Provincial Congresses in Halifax in 1776.  He served seven terms representing Granville County in the North Carolina General Assembly between 1779 and 1787.  In 1782-1783, he was elected to the North Carolina Council of State by the General Assembly.

Philemon and Delia had six children:  John Hawkins, Joseph Hawkins, Benjamin Hawkins, Philemon Hawkins, III,  Delia Hawkins, and Ann Hawkins.  Lieutenant Colonel Joseph Hawkins and Major John Hawkins served in the Warren County Regiment, along with their father.

Military service
He served in the North Carolina militia during the Revolutionary War:
 September 9, 1775: He was appointed by the North Carolina Provincial Congress to serve as a lieutenant colonel in Bute County Regiment in which he served until the regiment was abolished in 1779
 May 3, 1776: The Provincial Congress selected him as a colonel over the 2nd Battalion of Militia.   He did not stay with this unit and resigned this commission.   
 January 30, 1779: He was appointed to serve as a lieutenant colonel in the Warren County Regiment, which was created after Bute County and the Bute County Regiment were abolished.

He died on September 10, 1801 in Warren County, North Carolina and was buried at the family homestead (Pleasant Hill/Hawkins House), along with his wife who died in 1794.

See also
 Battle of Alamance

References

 
 
 
 
 
 

1717 births
1801 deaths
American slave owners
North Carolina militiamen in the American Revolution
Bute County, North Carolina
People from Granville County, North Carolina
People from Vance County, North Carolina
Members of the North Carolina Provincial Congresses
North Carolina Council of State
Members of the North Carolina House of Representatives